Berg im Gau is a municipality in the district of Neuburg-Schrobenhausen in Bavaria in Germany.

References

Neuburg-Schrobenhausen